The Bury St Edmunds and Thetford Railway (B&TR) built the Thetford to Bury St Edmunds line from Thetford to Bury St Edmunds with assistance from the Thetford and Watton Railway. The railway was authorised on 5 July 1873 and opened on 1 March 1876. Services were operated by the Thetford and Watton Railway until it was taken over by the Great Eastern Railway on 22 July 1878.

See also
 Thetford to Bury St Edmunds line

References

Rail transport in Suffolk
Rail transport in Norfolk
Great Eastern Railway
Pre-grouping British railway companies
Railway companies established in 1873
Railway companies disestablished in 1878
British companies disestablished in 1878
British companies established in 1873